François Hentges (11 June 1885 – 1 April 1968) was a Luxembourgian gymnast who competed in the 1912 Summer Olympics. He was born in Bonnevoie.

In 1912, he was a member of the Luxembourgian team which finished fourth in the team, European system competition and fifth in the team, free system event. In the individual all-around he finished 23rd.

References

External links
 

1885 births
1968 deaths
Luxembourgian male artistic gymnasts
Olympic gymnasts of Luxembourg
Gymnasts at the 1912 Summer Olympics
20th-century Luxembourgian people